Qilizhuang is an interchange station between Line 9 and Line 14 of the Beijing Subway. When Line 14 opened in May 2013, trains skipped this station.  The station was opened to Line 14 trains on February 15, 2014.

Station Layout 
The line 9 station uses an underground island platform, and the line 14 station uses 2 underground stacked side platforms. The eastbound line 14 platform is located under the line 9 platforms, whilst the westbound line 14 platform is located above the line 9 platforms.

Exits 
There are 6 exits, lettered A, B, C, E, G, and H. Exit A is accessible. There is also an unnamed accessible exit.

Gallery

References

External links

Beijing Subway stations in Fengtai District
Railway stations in China opened in 2011